Robb is a hamlet in west-central Alberta, Canada within Yellowhead County that is recognized as a designated place by Statistics Canada.

It was named after Peter (Baldy) Addison Robb (1887–1954), a freighter and prospector.

The hamlet is located in Census Division No. 14 and in the federal riding of Yellowhead.

Demographics 

Climate

See also 
List of communities in Alberta
List of designated places in Alberta
List of hamlets in Alberta

References 

Designated places in Alberta
Hamlets in Alberta
Yellowhead County